Andrew Niblett (born 25 April 1977) is a New Zealand cricketer. He played in five first-class matches for Central Districts in 2006 and 2007, and for Basingstoke and North Hants in the Southern Premier Cricket League in England in 2014. He has also worked as a cricket coach in South Africa, the Netherlands, England and Australia.

See also
 List of Central Districts representative cricketers

References

External links
 

1977 births
Living people
New Zealand cricketers
Central Districts cricketers
People from Vanderbijlpark